San Marino competed at the 2020 Summer Olympics in Tokyo. Originally scheduled to take place from 24 July to 9 August 2020, the Games were postponed to 23 July to 8 August 2021, because of the COVID-19 pandemic. It was the nation's fifteenth appearance at the Summer Olympics.

A bronze medal, the nation's first Olympic medal, was won by female trap shooter Alessandra Perilli. With this San Marino became the smallest country, by population, ever to have won any Olympic medal. Just two days later, on 31 July, Perilli and Gian Marco Berti won the country's second medal, a silver in the mixed trap shooting event. San Marino then took home its third medal on August 5, with Myles Amine winning bronze in the 86 kg freestyle wrestling event. With 5 competitors in 4 sports, San Marino won the most overall medals per population.

Medalists

On 29 July, Alessandra Perilli won bronze in the women's trap shooting; this was San Marino's first ever Olympic medal.

Competitors
The following is the list of number of competitors in the Games.

Judo

San Marino received an invitation from the Tripartite Commission and the International Judo Federation to send Paolo Persoglia in the men's middleweight category (90 kg) to the Olympics, marking the nation's return to the sport for the first time since Atlanta 1996.

Shooting

Sammarinese shooters achieved quota places for the following events by virtue of their best finishes at the 2018 ISSF World Championships, the 2019 ISSF World Cup series, European Championships or Games, and European Qualifying Tournament, as long as they obtained a minimum qualifying score (MQS) by 31 May 2020. On 29 July Alessandra Perilli won bronze in the women's trap shooting, this was San Marino's first ever Olympic medal; Perilli had previously finished joint second but missed out on a medal in a shoot-off during the 2012 Summer Olympics.

Swimming

San Marino received a universality invitation from FINA to send a top-ranked female swimmer in the women's long-distance freestyle events to the Olympics, based on the FINA Points System of 28 June 2021.

Wrestling

For the first time since Rome 1960, San Marino qualified one wrestler for the men's freestyle 86 kg into the Olympic competition, as a result of his top six finish at the 2019 World Championships.

Freestyle

References

Nations at the 2020 Summer Olympics
2020
2021 in Sammarinese sport